The 1990–91 2. Bundesliga season was the seventeenth season of the 2. Bundesliga, the second tier of the German football league system. It was the last season in which the league consisted of West German clubs only. From 1991–92 onwards clubs from the former East Germany joined the league.

FC Schalke 04, MSV Duisburg and Stuttgarter Kickers were promoted to the Bundesliga while Rot-Weiss Essen, Preußen Münster, TSV Havelse and FC Schweinfurt 05 were relegated to the Oberliga.

League table
For the 1990–91 season VfB Oldenburg, TSV Havelse, 1. FSV Mainz 05 and 1. FC Schweinfurt 05 were newly promoted to the 2. Bundesliga from the Oberliga while SV Waldhof Mannheim and FC 08 Homburg had been relegated to the league from the Bundesliga.

Results

Top scorers 
The league's top scorers:

References

External links
 2. Bundesliga 1990/1991 at Weltfussball.de 
 1990–91 2. Bundesliga at kicker.de 

1990-91
2
Germany